Tears of Mortal Solitude is the first full-length album by the Russian symphonic black / doom / Gothic metal band Forest Stream. It was released on January 27, 2003 through Earache Records.

Track listing

 "Autumn Elegy" – 3:52	
 "Legend" – 8:07	
 "Last Season Purity" – 12:15	
 "Snowfall" – 9:55	
 "Mel Kor" – 8:50	
 "Whole" – 5:15	
 "Black Swans" – 10:33	
 "Winter Solstice" – 8:27	
 "Steps of Mankind" – 1:34

Personnel 

Sonm the Darkest – vocals
Wizard Omin – guitars
Berserk – guitars
Anth – bass
Anate – keyboards
Elhella – drums

2003 albums
Forest Stream albums
Earache Records albums